The 2012 ITS Cup was a professional tennis tournament played on outdoor clay courts. It was the fourth edition of the tournament which was part of the 2012 ITF Women's Circuit. It took place in Olomouc, Czech Republic, on 23–29 July 2012.

WTA entrants

Seeds 

 Rankings as of 16 July 2012

Other entrants 
The following players received wildcards into the singles main draw:
  Anna Korzeniak
  Kateřina Kramperová
  Vanda Lukács
  Anastasija Sevastova

The following players received entry from the qualifying draw:
  Elena Bovina
  Corinna Dentoni
  Inés Ferrer Suárez
  Kristína Kučová

The following player received entry from a Special Exempt spot:
  María Teresa Torró Flor

The following player received entry through her Protected Ranking:
  Zuzana Ondrášková

Champions

Singles 

  María Teresa Torró Flor def.  Alexandra Cadanțu 6–2, 6–3

Doubles 

  Inés Ferrer Suárez /  Richèl Hogenkamp def.  Yuliya Beygelzimer /  Renata Voráčová 6–2, 7–6(7–4)

External links 
 Official website
 2012 ITS Cup at ITFtennis.com

ITS
2012 in Czech tennis
ITS
2012 in Czech women's sport